Distocyclus  is a genus of South American glass knifefishes, with one species in the Amazon basin and another in rivers in French Guiana.

Species
There are currently two recognized species in this genus. A third species has sometimes been recognized, but it is better placed in the genus Eigenmannia as E. goajira, although its exact taxonomic position is unresolved.

 Distocyclus conirostris C. H. Eigenmann & W. R. Allen, 1942
 Distocyclus guchereauae Meunier, Jégu & Keith, 2014

References

Sternopygidae
Fish of South America
Freshwater fish genera
Taxa named by Francisco Mago Leccia